The Boccia Individual BC4 event at the 2008 Summer Paralympics was held in the Olympic Green Convention Center on 7–9 September.
The preliminary stages consisted of 4 round-robin groups of 4 competitors each. The top two players in each group qualified for the final stages.
The event was won by Dirceu Pinto, representing .

Results

Preliminaries

Pool A

 after an extra (fifth) end

Pool B

Pool C

Pool D

Competition bracket

References

Boccia at the 2008 Summer Paralympics